The Scream 2007 ceremony was held on October 19, 2007 at The Greek Theatre in Los Angeles. It was the third annual iteration of what was originally called the Spike Scream Awards, an award show dedicated to the horror, sci-fi, and fantasy genres of feature films, and the first to be held under the "Scream + Year" relabeling.

Performances included Avenged Sevenfold, Ozzy Osbourne and the collaboration of Alice Cooper, Rob Zombie and Slash.

Special awards
 Comic-Con Icon Award - Neil Gaiman
 Hero Award - Harrison Ford
 Scream Rock Immortal Award - Alice Cooper

World premieres
 Sweeney Todd: The Demon Barber of Fleet Street presented by Tim Burton
 Beowulf presented by Neil Gaiman, Ray Winstone and Roger Avery
 Repo! The Genetic Opera presented by Anthony Stewart Head, Bill Moseley and Paris Hilton
 The Mist presented by Thomas Jane

Performances
 "Not Going Away" performed by Ozzy Osbourne
 "Scream" performed by Avenged Sevenfold
 Alice Cooper Medley: "I Love the Dead" and "School's Out" performed by "The Monsters of Rock" (Alice Cooper, Rob Zombie and Slash)

Competitive categories
Nominees and winners for each announced category are listed below. Winners are listed in boldface.

The Ultimate Scream
 300
 28 Weeks Later
 Battlestar Galactica
 The Descent
 Harry Potter and the Order of the Phoenix
 Heroes
 Pan's Labyrinth
 Pirates of the Caribbean: At World's End
 Spider-Man 3
 Transformers

Best Horror Movie
 28 Weeks Later
 1408
 The Descent
 Grindhouse
 The Host
 Hostel: Part II

Best Fantasy Movie
 Pan's Labyrinth
 Harry Potter and the Order of the Phoenix
 Pirates of the Caribbean: At World's End
 Spider-Man 3
 Stardust

Best Science Fiction Movie
 Transformers
 Children of Men
 The Fountain
 The Prestige
 Sunshine

Best TV Show
 Heroes
 Battlestar Galactica
 Doctor Who
 Lost
 Masters of Horror

Best Sequel
 Harry Potter and the Order of the Phoenix
 28 Weeks Later
 Pirates of the Caribbean: At World's End
 Saw III
 Spider-Man 3

Best Superhero
 Tobey Maguire as Spider-Man, Spider-Man 3
 Michael Chiklis as The Thing, Fantastic Four: Rise of the Silver Surfer
 Chris Evans as Human Torch, Fantastic Four: Rise of the Silver Surfer 
 Masi Oka as Hiro Nakamura, Heroes
 Milo Ventimiglia as Peter Petrelli, Heroes

Best Comic-to-Screen Adaptation
 300
 Fantastic Four: Rise of the Silver Surfer
 Ghost Rider
 Spider-Man 3
 TMNT

Scream Queen

Scream King
 Shia LaBeouf as Kale Brecht, Disturbia
 John Cusack as Mike Enslin, 1408
 Samuel L. Jackson, Snakes on a Plane
 Angus Macfadyen as Jeff Denlon, Saw III
 Freddy Rodriguez, Grindhouse
 Luke Wilson as David Fox, Vacancy

Most Vile Villain
 Ralph Fiennes as Lord Voldemort, Harry Potter and the Order of the Phoenix
 Tobin Bell and Shawnee Smith as Jigsaw Killer, Saw III
 Thomas Haden Church as Sandman, Spider-Man 3
 Topher Grace as Eddie Brock/Venom, Spider-Man 3
 Sergi López as Captain Vidal, Pan's Labyrinth
 Michelle Pfeiffer, Stardust
 Zachary Quinto as Gabriel Gray/Sylar, Heroes
 Kurt Russell as Stuntman Mike, Grindhouse
 Rodrigo Santoro as Xerxes, 300

Most Memorable Mutilation
 Dismembered in car crash, Grindhouse
 Battle vs. the Immortals, 300
 Cranial surgery, Saw III
 Eaten alive by cannibal, Hostel Part II
 Mouth sliced open and sewn back together, Pan's Labyrinth

Breakout Performance
 Hayden Panettiere, Heroes
 Clare-Hope Ashitey, Children of Men
 Zoë Bell, Grindhouse
 Lauren German, Hostel: Part II
 Shauna MacDonald, The Descent
 Rodrigo Santoro, 300

"Jump-From-Your-Seat" Scene of the Year
 Final battle: Megatron vs. Optimus Prime, Transformers
 Attack of the Uber Immortal, 300
 Mid-Air battle: Spider-Man vs. The New Goblin, Spider-Man 3
 The rain of arrows, 300
 Zombie attacks glass window, 28 Weeks Later

See also
 Saturn Award

References

Scream Awards